The Great Seljuk Empire, or the Seljuk Empire, was a high medieval, culturally Turco-Persian, Sunni Muslim empire, founded and ruled by the Qïnïq branch of Oghuz Turks.

The Seljuk Empire was founded in 1037 by Tughril (990–1063) and his brother Chaghri (989–1060), both of whom co-ruled over its territories; there are indications that the Seljuk leadership otherwise functioned as a triumvirate and thus included Musa Yabghu, the uncle of the aforementioned two. From their homelands near the Aral Sea, the Seljuks advanced first into Khorasan and into the Iranian mainland, where they would become largely based as a Persianate society. They then moved west to conquer Baghdad, filling up the power vacuum that had been caused by struggles between the Arab Abbasid Caliphate and the Iranian Buyid Empire. The subsequent Seljuk expansion into eastern Anatolia triggered the Byzantine–Seljuk wars, with the Battle of Manzikert in 1071 marking a decisive turning point in the conflict in favour of the Seljuks, undermining the authority of the Byzantine Empire in the remaining parts of Anatolia and gradually enabling the region's Turkification. The Seljuk Empire united the fractured political landscape in the non-Arab eastern parts of the Muslim world and played a key role in both the First Crusade and Second Crusade; it also played an important part in the creation and expansion of multiple art forms during the period in which they had influence.

By the 1140s, the Seljuk Empire began to decline in power and influence, and was eventually supplanted by the Khwarazmian Empire in 1194.

History

Founder of the dynasty 
The founder of the Seljuq dynasty was an Oghuz Turkic warlord Seljuk. He was reputed to have served in the Khazar army, under whom, the Seljuks migrated to Khwarezm, near the city of Jend, where they converted to Islam in 985. Khwarezm, administered by the Ma'munids, was under the nominal control of the Samanid Empire. By 999 the Samanids fell to the Kara-Khanids in Transoxiana, but the Ghaznavids occupied the lands south of the Oxus. The Seljuks became involved, having supported the last Samanid emir against the Kara-Khanids, in this power struggle in the region before establishing their own independent base.

Expansion of the empire

Tughril and Chaghri 

Oghuz Turks (also known as Turkmens at the time), led by Seljuq's son, Musa and his two nephews, Tughril and Chaghri, were one of several groups of the Oghuz who made their way to Iran between about 1020 and 1040, first moving south to Transoxiana, and then to Khorasan, initially at the invitation of the local rulers, then under alliances and conflicts. However, prior to the arrival of the Seljuks to Khorasan, other Oghuz Turks were already present in the area: that is, the northern slopes of Kopet Dag mountains, which is principally the region stretching from the Caspian Sea to Merv; what is today – Turkmenistan. Contemporary sources mention places such as Dahistan, Farawa and Nasa, as well as Sarakhs, all in present-day Turkmenistan.

Around 1034, Tughril and Chaghri were soundly defeated by the Oghuz Yabghu Ali Tegin and his allies, forcing them to escape from Transoxiana. Initially, Turkmens took refuge in Khwarazm, which served as one of their traditional pastures, but they were also encouraged by the local Ghaznavid governor, Harun, who hoped to utilise Seljuqs for his efforts to seize Khorasan from his sovereign. When Harun was assassinated by Ghaznavid agents in 1035, they again had to flee, this time heading south across the Karakum Desert. First, Turkmens made their way to the important city of Merv, but perhaps due to its strong fortification, they then changed their route westwards to take refuge in Nasa. Finally, they arrived on the edges of Khorasan, the province considered a jewel in the Ghaznavid crown.

After moving into Khorasan, Seljuks under Tughril wrested an empire from the Ghaznavids. Initially the Seljuks were repulsed by Mahmud and retired to Khwarezm, but Tughril and Chaghri led them to capture Merv and Nishapur (1037–1038). Later they repeatedly raided and traded territory with his successor, Mas'ud, across Khorasan and Balkh.

In 1040, at the Battle of Dandanaqan, Seljuqs decisively defeated Mas'ud I of Ghazni, forcing him to abandon most of his western territories. Afterwards, Turkmens employed Khorasanians and set up a Persian bureaucracy to administer their new polity with Toghrul as its nominal overlord. By 1046, Abbasid caliph al-Qa'im had sent Tughril a diploma recognizing Seljuk rule over Khurasan. In 1048–1049, the Seljuk Turks, commanded by Ibrahim Yinal, uterine brother of Tughril, made their first incursion into the Byzantine frontier region of Iberia and clashed with a combined Byzantine-Georgian army of 50,000 at the Battle of Kapetrou on 10 September 1048. The devastation left behind by the Seljuk raid was so fearful that the Byzantine magnate Eustathios Boilas described, in 1051–1052, those lands as "foul and unmanageable... inhabited by snakes, scorpions, and wild beasts." The Arab chronicler Ibn al-Athir reports that Ibrahim brought back 100,000 captives and a vast booty loaded on the backs of ten thousand camels. In 1055, Tughril entered Baghdad and removed the influence of the Buyid dynasty, under a commission from the Abbasid caliph.

Alp Arslan 

Alp Arslan, the son of Chaghri Beg, expanded significantly upon Tughril's holdings by adding Armenia and Georgia in 1064 and invading the Byzantine Empire in 1068, from which he annexed almost all of Anatolia. Arslan's decisive victory at the Battle of Manzikert in 1071 effectively neutralized the Byzantine resistance to the Turkish invasion of Anatolia, although the Georgians were able to recover from Alp Arslan's invasion by securing the theme of Iberia. The Byzantine withdrawal from Anatolia brought Georgia in more direct contact with the Seljuks. In 1073 the Seljuk Amirs of Ganja, Dvin and Dmanisi invaded Georgia and were defeated by George II of Georgia, who successfully took the fortress of Kars. A retaliatory strike by the Seljuk Amir Ahmad defeated the Georgians at Kvelistsikhe.

Alp Arslan authorized his Turkoman generals to carve their own principalities out of formerly Byzantine Anatolia, as atabegs loyal to him. Within two years the Turkmens had established control as far as the Aegean Sea under numerous beghliks (modern Turkish beyliks): the Saltukids in Northeastern Anatolia, the Shah-Armens and the Mengujekids in Eastern Anatolia, Artuqids in Southeastern Anatolia, Danishmendis in Central Anatolia, Rum Seljuks (Beghlik of Suleyman, which later moved to Central Anatolia) in Western Anatolia, and the Beylik of Tzachas of Smyrna in İzmir (Smyrna).

Malik Shah I 

Under Alp Arslan's successor, Malik Shah, and his two Persian viziers, Nizām al-Mulk and Tāj al-Mulk, the Seljuk state expanded in various directions, to the former Iranian border of the days before the Arab invasion, so that it soon bordered China in the east and the Byzantines in the west. Malikshāh was the one who moved the capital from Ray to Isfahan. The Iqta military system and the Nizāmīyyah University at Baghdad were established by Nizām al-Mulk, and the reign of Malikshāh was reckoned the golden age of "Great Seljuk". The Abbasid Caliph titled him "The Sultan of the East and West" in 1087. The Assassins (Hashshashin) of Hassan-i Sabāh started to become a force during his era, however, and they assassinated many leading figures in his administration; according to many sources these victims included Nizām al-Mulk.

Internally, the most prominent development of Malik Shah's rule was the continuous increase in the power of the Nizām al-Mulk. Some contemporary chroniclers refer to the period as "al-dawla al-Nizamiyya", the Nizam's state, while modern scholars have mentioned him as "the real ruler of the Seljuq empire". The 14-century biographer Subki claimed that Nizām al-Mulk's vizierate was "not just a vizierate, it was above the sultanate".

Ahmad Sanjar 

Ahmad was the son of Malik Shah I and initially took part in wars of succession against his three brothers and a nephew: Mahmud I, Barkiyaruq, Malik Shah II and Muhammad I Tapar. In 1096, he was tasked to govern the province of Khorasan by his brother Muhammad I. Over the next several years, Ahmad Sanjar became the ruler of most of Iran (Persia), and eventually in 1118, the sole ruler of the Great Seljuk Empire.

In 1141, Ahmad marched to eliminate the threat posed by Kara Khitans and faced them in the vicinity of Samarkand at the Battle of Qatwan. He suffered his first defeat in his long career, and as a result lost all Seljuk territory east of the Syr Darya.

Sanjar's as well as the Seljuks' rule collapsed as a consequence of yet another unexpected defeat, this time at the hands of the Seljuks' own tribe, in 1153. Sanjar was captured during the battle and held in captivity until 1156. It brought chaos to the Empire - a situation later exploited by the victorious Turkmens, whose hordes would overrun Khorasan unopposed, wreaking colossal damage on the province and prestige of Sanjar. Sanjar eventually escaped from captivity in the fall of 1156, but soon died in Merv in 1157. After his death, Turkic rulers, Turkmen tribal forces, and other secondary powers competed for Khorasan, and after a long period of confrontations, the province was finally conquered by Khwarazmians in the early 1200s.

The Tomb of Ahmed Sanjar was destroyed by the Mongols led by Tolui, who sacked the city of Merv in 1221, killing 700,000 people according to contemporary sources during their catastrophic invasion of Khwarazm; however, modern scholarship holds such figures to be exaggerated.

Division of empire 

When Malikshāh I died in 1092, the empire split as his brother and four sons quarrelled over the apportioning of the empire among themselves. Malikshāh I was succeeded in Anatolia by Kilij Arslan I, who founded the Sultanate of Rum, and in Syria by his brother Tutush I. In Persia he was succeeded by his son Mahmud I, whose reign was contested by his other three brothers Barkiyaruq in Iraq, Muhammad I in Baghdad, and Ahmad Sanjar in Khorasan. When Tutush I died, his sons Radwan and Duqaq inherited Aleppo and Damascus respectively and contested with each other as well, further dividing Syria amongst emirs antagonistic towards each other.

In 1118, the third son Ahmad Sanjar took over the empire. His nephew, the son of Muhammad I, did not recognize his claim to the throne, and Mahmud II proclaimed himself Sultan and established a capital in Baghdad, until 1131 when he was finally officially deposed by Ahmad Sanjar.

Elsewhere in nominal Seljuk territory were the Artuqids in northeastern Syria and northern Mesopotamia; they controlled Jerusalem until 1098. The Dānišmand dynasty founded a state in eastern Anatolia and northern Syria and contested land with the Sultanate of Rum, and Kerbogha exercised independence as the atabeg of Mosul.

First Crusade (1095–1099) 

During the First Crusade, the fractured states of the Seljuks were generally more concerned with consolidating their own territories and gaining control of their neighbours than with cooperating against the crusaders. The Seljuks easily defeated the People's Crusade arriving in 1096, but they could not stop the progress of the army of the subsequent Princes' Crusade, which took important cities such as Nicaea (İznik), Iconium (Konya), Caesarea Mazaca (Kayseri), and Antioch (Antakya) on its march to Jerusalem (Al-Quds). In 1099 the crusaders finally captured the Holy Land and set up the first Crusader states. The Seljuks had already lost Palestine to the Fatimids, who had recaptured it just before its capture by the crusaders.

After pillaging the County of Edessa, Seljukid commander Ilghazi made peace with the Crusaders. In 1121 he went north towards Georgia and with supposedly up to 250 000 – 350 000 troops, including men led by his son-in-law Sadaqah and Sultan Malik of Ganja, he invaded the Kingdom of Georgia. David IV of Georgia gathered 40,000 Georgian warriors, including 5,000 monaspa guards, 15,000 Kipchaks, 300 Alans and 100 French Crusaders to fight against Ilghazi's vast army. At the Battle of Didgori on August 12, 1121, the Seljuks were routed, being run down by pursuing Georgian cavalry for several days afterward. The battle helped the Crusader states, which had been under pressure from Ilghazi's armies. The weakening of the main enemy of the Latin principalities also benefitted the Kingdom of Jerusalem under King Baldwin II.

Second Crusade (1147–1149) 

During this time conflict with the Crusader states was also intermittent, and after the First Crusade increasingly independent atabegs would frequently ally with the Crusader states against other atabegs as they vied with each other for territory. At Mosul, Zengi succeeded Kerbogha as atabeg and successfully began the process of consolidating the atabegs of Syria. In 1144 Zengi captured Edessa, as the County of Edessa had allied itself with the Artuqids against him. This event triggered the launch of the Second Crusade. Nur ad-Din, one of Zengi's sons who succeeded him as atabeg of Aleppo, created an alliance in the region to oppose the Second Crusade, which landed in 1147.

Decline 

Ahmad Sanjar fought to contain the revolts by the Kara-Khanids in Transoxiana, Ghurids in Afghanistan and Qarluks in modern Kyrghyzstan, as well as the nomadic invasion of the Kara-Khitais in the east. The advancing Kara-Khitais first defeated the Eastern Kara-Khanids, then followed up by crushing the Western Kara-Khanids, who were vassals of the Seljuks at Khujand. The Kara-Khanids turned to their Seljuk overlords for assistance, to which Sanjar responded by personally leading an army against the Kara-Khitai. However, Sanjar's army was decisively defeated by the host of Yelu Dashi at the Battle of Qatwan on September 9, 1141. While Sanjar managed to escape with his life, many of his close kin including his wife were taken captive in the battle's aftermath. As a result of Sanjar's failure to deal with the encroaching threat from the east, the Seljuk Empire lost all its eastern provinces up to the river Syr Darya, and vassalage of the Western Kara-Khanids was usurped by the Kara-Khitai, otherwise known as the Western Liao in Chinese historiography.

Conquest by Khwarezm and the Ayyubids 

In 1153, the Ghuzz (Oghuz Turks) rebelled and captured Sanjar. He managed to escape after three years but died a year later. The atabegs, such as the Zengids and Artuqids, were only nominally under the Seljuk Sultan, and generally controlled Syria independently. When Ahmad Sanjar died in 1157, this fractured the empire even further and rendered the atabegs effectively independent.

 Khorasani Seljuks in Khorasan and Transoxiana. Capital: Merv
 Kerman Seljuk Sultanate
 Sultanate of Rum (or Seljuks of Turkey). Capital: Iznik (Nicaea), later Konya (Iconium)
 Atabeghlik of the Salghurids in Fars
 Atabeghlik of Eldiguzids (Atabeg of Azerbaijan) in Iraq and Azerbaijan. Capital: Nakhchivan (1136–1175), Hamadan (1176–1186), Tabriz (1187–1225) 
 Atabeghlik of Bori in Syria. Capital: Damascus
 Atabeghlik of Zangi in Al Jazira (Northern Mesopotamia). Capital: Mosul
 Turcoman Beghliks: Danishmendis, Artuqids, Saltuqids and Mengujekids in Asia Minor

After the Second Crusade, Nur ad-Din's general Shirkuh, who had established himself in Egypt on Fatimid land, was succeeded by Saladin. In time, Saladin rebelled against Nur ad-Din, and, upon his death, Saladin married his widow and captured most of Syria and created the Ayyubid dynasty.

On other fronts, the Kingdom of Georgia began to become a regional power and extended its borders at the expense of Great Seljuk. The same was true during the revival of the Armenian Kingdom of Cilicia under Leo II of Armenia in Anatolia. The Abbasid caliph An-Nasir also began to reassert the authority of the caliph and allied himself with the Khwarezmshah Takash.

For a brief period, Togrul III was the Sultan of all Seljuk except for Anatolia. However, Togrul was defeated by Takash, the Shah of Khwarezmid Empire, and the Seljuk Empire finally collapsed in 1194. Of the former Seljuk Empire, only the Sultanate of Rûm in Anatolia remained.

The Khwarazmian Empire took over as the dominant power in the region, but the Mongol invasion of the Khwarazmian Empire in 1219-1220 finally destroyed it.

The Sultanate of Rûm, the last remnants of the Seljuks in Anatolia, ended too with the Mongol invasions of Anatolia in the 1260s, and it was divided it into small emirates called the Anatolian beyliks. Eventually one of these, the Ottoman, would rise to power and conquer the rest.

Governance 

Seljuk power was indeed at its zenith under Malikshāh I, and both the Qarakhanids and Ghaznavids had to acknowledge the overlordship of the Seljuks. The Seljuk dominion was established over the ancient Sasanian domains, in Iran and Iraq, and included Anatolia, Syria, as well as parts of Central Asia and modern Afghanistan. Seljuk rule was modelled after the tribal organization common among Turkic and Mongol nomads and resembled a 'family federation' or 'appanage state'. Under this organization, the leading member of the paramount family assigned family members portions of his domains as autonomous appanages.

Various emblems and banners have been recorded as having been used by the Seljuks in different periods. Early Seljuks used their traditional emblems, but gradually adopted local Muslim signs and banners. The official flag of the empire was most probably a black flag, similar to that of the Abbasid Caliphate. The flag was decorated with signs, which were either superimposed over it, or placed above the flag.

Capital cities 

Seljuks exercised full control over Islamic Central Asia and the Middle East between 1040 and 1157. For most of its history, the empire was split into western and eastern half and did not have a single capital or political center. In the east, the chief seat of Seljuk rule was Marv in present-day Turkmenistan. In the west, various cities, where the Seljuk rulers lived periodically, served as capitals: Rayy, Isfahan, Baghdad, and later Hamadan. These western lands were known as the Sultanate of Iraq. Since 1118, the Seljuk rulers of Iraq recognized the suzerainty of the great Seljuk sultan Sanjar, who mostly ruled from Marv, and was known by the title of al-sultān al-a'zam, "the Greatest Sultan". The Seljuk rulers of Iraq were often mentioned as the "Lesser Seljuks".

Culture and language 

Much of the ideological character of the Seljuq Empire was derived from the earlier Samanid and Ghaznavid kingdoms, which had in turn emerged from the Perso-Islamic imperial system of the Abbasid caliphate. This Perso-Islamic tradition was based on pre-Islamic Iranian ideas of kingship molded into an Islamic framework. Little of the public symbolism used by the Seljuks was Turkic, namely the tughra. The populace of the Seljuk Empire would have considered this Perso-Islamic tradition more significant than that of steppe customs.

Highly Persianized in culture and language, the Seljuks also played an important role in the development of the Turko-Persian tradition, even exporting Persian culture to Anatolia. Under the Seljuks, Persian was also used for books lecturing about politics in the Mirrors for princes genre, such as the prominent Siyasatnama (Book of Politics) composed by Nizam al-Mulk. During this period, these type of books consciously made use of Islamic and Iranian traditions, such as an ideal government based on the Islamic prophet Muhammad and his successors, or the Sasanian King of Kings Khosrow I.

In most of their coins, the Seljuk sultans used the Sasanian title of shahanshah (King of Kings), and even used the old Buyid title of "Shahanshah of Islam." The title of malik was used by lesser princes of the Seljuk family. Like the caliphate, the Seljuks relied on a refined Persian bureaucracy. The settlement of Turkic tribes in the northwestern peripheral parts of the empire, for the strategic military purpose of fending off invasions from neighboring states, led to the progressive Turkicization of those areas. According to the 12th-century poet Nizami Aruzi, all of the Seljuk sultans had a liking for poetry, which is also demonstrated by the large compilation of Persian verses written under their patronage. This had already started under Tughril, who was praised in Arabic and Persian by poets such as Fakhruddin As'ad Gurgani and Bakharzi, albeit he could not understand the verses. The last Seljuk sultan Tughril III was well known for his Persian poetry. The Saljuq-nama of Zahir al-Din Nishapuri, which was most likely dedicated to Tughril III, indicates that the Seljuk family now used Persian to communicate, and even were taught about the achievements of their forefathers in that language.

Tughril relied on his vizier to translate from Arabic and Persian into Turkic for him, and Oghuz songs were sung at the wedding of Tughril to the caliph's daughter. Later sultans, like Mahmud, could speak Arabic alongside Persian, however, they still used Turkic among themselves. The most significant evidence of the importance of Turkic language is the extensive Turkic–Arabic dictionary, or the Dīwān Lughāt al-Turk, assembled in Baghdad for Caliph al-Muqtadi by Mahmud al-Kashgari. However, besides the Diwan, no works written in Turkic language survive from the Seljuk Empire. While the Maliknama was compiled from Turkic oral accounts, it was written in Persian and Arabic languages.

Steppe traditions influenced Seljuk marriages, with Tughril marrying his brother Chaghri's widow, a practice despised in Islam. Seljuk ceremonies were based on the Abbasid model, but sometimes ancient Iranian ceremonies were observed. During a night in 1091, all of Baghdad was lit with candles under the orders of Malik-Shah I, which resembled the Zoroastrian ritual of sadhak.

Religion

In 985, the Seljuks migrated to the city of Jend where they converted to Islam. The arrival of the Seljuq Turks into Persia, and their patronage of constructing madrassas, allowed for Sunni Islam to become the dominant sect of Islam.

In 1046, Tughril built the madrasa, al-Sultaniya in Nishapur, while Chaghri Beg founded a madrasa in Merv. Tughril and Alp Arslan chose Hanafi qadis and preachers for these madrassas. By 1063, there were twenty-five madrassas scattered throughout Persia and Khorasan, founded by Seljuq princes. In the 12th century there were over thirty madrassas in Baghdad.

In 1056, Tughril built a Friday mosque with a newly constructed quarter in Baghdad which was surrounded by a wall. The new quarter separated the Shia community from the Sunnis, since there had been frequent outbreaks of violence. Through the influence of Tughril's vizier, al-Kunduri, a Hanafi Sunni, the Ash'ari and Ismaili Shi'ites were exiled from Khurasan and cursed at Friday sermons in Seljuq mosques. Al-Kunduri's vizierate persecuted Ash'aris and Sharifis, although this ended with the vizierate of Nizam al-Mulk. It was under the vizierate of al-Kunduri that the Islamic scholar, Al-Juwayni was forced to flee to Mecca and Medina. In 1065, Alp Arslan campaigned against the Kingdom of Georgia, subjugated Tbilisi, and built a mosque in the city.

In 1092, Malik-shah built the Jami al-Sultan Mosque in Baghdad. At the capital, Isfahan, Malik-shah had constructed a madrasa, a citadel and a castle near Dizkuh. Following Malik-Shah's death, the familial civil war drew attention away from religious patronage, slowing the building of madrassas and mosques. Although, in 1130, the Seljuk sultan Sanjar ordered the construction of the Quthamiyya madrasa in Samarkand.

While the Seljuk sultans were prodigious builders of religious houses, Seljuk viziers were no different. The Seljuk vizier, Nazim al-Mulk, founded the first madrasa in Baghdad, in 1063, called the Nizamiya. In the madrassas he built, he patronized Shafi'is. The vizier Taj al-Mulk and Malik-shah's widow, Terken Khatun, patronized the building of a madrasa to compete with Nazim's Nizamiya.

Until the death of Sultan Sanjar, the Seljuks were pious Sunnis, and represented a re-establishment of Sunni Islam in Iraq and western Persia since the 10th century.

Military

General overview 

The army of the earliest Seljuks was not similar to the renowned Turkic military of the classical 'Abbasid era. Their first invasions were more of a great nomadic migration accompanied by their families and livestock rather than planned military conquests. They were not a professional army; however, warfare was a way of life for nearly all of adult male Turkmens.

According to a Seljuk vizier, Nizam al-Mulk, by the reign of Malik-Shah I, the sovereign had a large army at his disposal. There were Turkmens, mamluks, a standing army, infantry and the sultan's personal guard. Nizam al-Mulk also estimated Malik-Shah's forces at 400,000 men, and often opposed cost-cutting plans (instituted by Taj al-Mulk) to bring these to 70,000.

Turkmens 
Vizier Nizam al-Mulk, the greatest advocate of Iranian orientation for the Seljuk empire, admitted the debt dynasty owed to the Turkmens. After the establishment of the Seljuk state, Turkmens continued to be the driving force behind the Seljuk expansion in Anatolia. After the rule of Malik-Shah I, however, there are very few mentions of Turkmens in the Jibali region of the state, especially in their traditional axis of Rayy, Hamadhan and Hulwan.

Turkmens were difficult to manage, and they were susceptible to undisciplined pillaging. The greatest issue, however, was their dependence on pasturelands for their livestock. A great number of regions that constituted the Seljuk state were ecologically ill-suited for supporting a nomadic army. Turkmens' limitations are adeptly described by Arab scholar Sibt ibn al-Jawzi:

 

Long campaigns had to be discontinued due to Turkmens' insistence on returning home, and conquests had to be scheduled to satisfy the demands of Turkmens. The short-term needs of Turkmens made a longer term military plans unachievable.

Mamluks 
The alternative to nomadic Turkmen troops was mamluks. While also of Turkic and often nomadic origin, dependence on pasturelands was non-existent for mamluks as they did not live a nomadic life. Previously, mamluks had constituted the later 'Abbasid, the Samanid and the Ghaznavid armies. In fact, the Ghaznavid dynasty was itself of mamluk origin.

The process of mamluk recruitment are well known from other periods in Islamic history, but there is almost no information directly relating to the Seljuks. The chief source of mamluks was most probably forays to the steppe. The alternative to raids was buying them from slave traders and various dealers as evidenced from a slave dispute between a merchant and Muhammad I Tapar.

Legacy 
The Seljuks were educated in the service of Muslim courts as slaves or mercenaries. The dynasty brought revival, energy, and reunion to the Islamic civilization hitherto dominated by Arabs and Persians.

The Seljuks founded universities and were also patrons of art and literature. Their reign is characterized by Persian astronomers such as Omar Khayyám, and the Persian philosopher al-Ghazali. Under the Seljuks, New Persian became the language for historical recording, while the center of Arabic language culture shifted from Baghdad to Cairo.

Sultans of the Seljuk Empire

Art of the Great Seljuk Empire

Architecture and ceramics 

Various art forms were popularized during the Seljuk period, as evidenced by the vast amount of surviving artifacts. Most Seljuk arts are known to have been produced in what is modern-day Iran. However, the Seljuk sultans also encouraged artists to settle in Anatolia as part of a recolonization and reconstruction process of several cities. Many works of Seljuk art continued to be produced following the decline of the empire in the late 12th century. In this regard, the timeline associated with the production of Seljuk art does not entirely match the political events pertaining to the empire and its eventual fall. Nonetheless, relatively little art can be correctly dated and ascribed to a Great Seljuq context. Much of the material deemed to be Seljuq in world museums in fact belongs to the period A.D. 1150–1250, after the fall of the Great Seljuq Empire, when there seems to have been a sudden burst in artistic production, apparently to a great extent unrelated to court patronage.
 

Among other ceramics, the manufacture of polychrome ceramic tiles, often used as decor in architecture, were popularized during the Seljuk dynasty. The Seljuks pioneered the use of the Minai technique, a painted and enameled polychrome overglaze for ceramics. The glazes on the Seljuk ceramics produced often ranged from a brilliant turquoise to a very dark blue. The art of Seljuk mosaic tile decorating would continue to dominate the interior of many Anatolian mosques following the period of Seljuk rule. The Seljuks also created ceramic house models, while other ceramic forms in the Seljuk period included pottery figurines, some of them children's toys.

In the realm of architecture, mosques and madrasas were created and embellished during the period of Seljuk control. Congregational mosques were either repaired, re-built, or constructed in their entirety. The Seljuk sultan also commissioned numerous madrasas to promote the teaching of orthodox Islamic sciences. These developments in architectural practice are coherent with the Seljuk dynasty's focus on Islam and the promotion of Muslim orthodoxy, the combining of Sufism and Sunnism.

One architectural form that flourished during the Seljuk dynasty was the muqarnas. Some interpretations maintain that the earliest known examples of muqarnas were constructed during the period of Seljuk hegemony, though it also remains possible that they were being developed at the same time in North Africa. The layering of multiple embellished cells with divergent profiles in muqarnas creates a dome that has a seemingly-insubstantial interior. The play of light on the surface enhances this visual effect. Art historian Oleg Grabar argues that the effect of muqarnas domes embodies Qur'anic water symbolism. Examples of muqarnas also appear in the niches of mosques built during the Seljuk empire. Overall, the architecture attributed to the Seljuk period is characterized by elaborate decoration, much like the other arts produced under Seljuk rule.

Book arts 
Both secular and non-secular manuscripts were produced during the Seljuk period. These pieces are now limited in availability, considering their ultimate susceptibility to damage overtime. But those manuscripts that have survived over the centuries provide insight into the Seljuk's involvement in the arts of the book. Calligraphers and illuminators were responsible for the creation of these manuscripts, though sometimes calligraphers mastered the art of both writing and illustration. By the end of the 10th century, both illuminators and calligraphers were beginning to employ various colors, styles, and writing techniques in the realm of the book arts.

The Qur'an's produced during the period of Seljuk rule evidence developments in calligraphy and other changes in how the holy text was divided. Uniquely, calligraphers during this period frequently combined several scripts on one page of the Qur'an, such as Kufic and New Style. In addition to these changes in the text, the dawn of the Seljuk empire coincided with a newfound increase in the popularity of paper as a replacement for parchment in the Islamic world. The use of durable paper increased the production of compact, single-volume Qur'an's, whereas parchment codexes often contained multiple volumes of Qur'anic text. Despite this development, parchment would remain popular for the production of some Qur'an's, and multi-volume pieces continued to be produced. Illuminated borders continued to distinguish the Qur'ans produced during the Seljuk period and relative consistency was maintained with regard to their structure.

One example of a manuscript created during Seljuk rule is a thirty-volume (juz) Qur'an created c.1050, produced by only one calligrapher and illuminator (Freer Gallery of Art, District of Columbia, F2001.16a-b). As paper had just been introduced to the Islamic world, this piece is an early Islamic paper manuscript. This Qur'an is bound in brown leather, dyed in pink, decorated with gold, and offers an intricate frontispiece. These elements imply the care that went into the production of this text and indications of frequent usage confirm that it was appreciated. It is primarily written in the vertical "New-Style" Arabic script, a sharp, vertical script. The dominant use of New Style in this folio, also referred to as "new Abbasid Script," attests to the shift from the geometric Kufic script to a more legible calligraphic style, which occurred in the 10th century. Scattered remnants of Kufic, used primarily to indicate volume and page number, also appear in the text. The verticality of the paper in this manuscript speaks to the historic shift away from the horizontal use of paper in many Qur'ans, also a 10th-century development. 

Another example of a religious manuscript produced closer to the end of the period of Seljuk Rule is the Qarmathian Qur'an (dispersed folio, Arthur M. Stackler Gallery of Art, District of Columbia, S1986.65a-b). This manuscript's folios are illuminated with a gold border and thin, spiraled illustration, featuring vegetal motifs. Despite the generous illumination, the four lines of Qur'anic text on the folio are exceptionally legible. Created between the years 1170–1200, this particular folio demonstrates the evolution of New Style, as both vocalized cursive and diacritical dots appear in this later version of the script. Only during the 13th century would New Style be replaced by the curvier proportional scripts for regular use.

A final example of a Seljuk Qur'an that has entered into scholarship is a manuscript studied in-depth by the late art historian Richard Ettinghausen. This piece was written in 1164 by Mahmud Ibn Al-Husayn and contains the entirety of the Qur'an (University of Pennsylvania Museum of Archaeology and Anthropology, Philadelphia, NEP27). Unlike the two Seljuk Qur'ans discussed prior, this manuscript primarily contains Naskh script, another early Arabic script that replaced Kufic. However, some Kufic calligraphy is embedded in the chapter headings. This aspect speaks to how the inclusion of Kufic in Qur'ans became more of a decorative element overtime, often included in headings as opposed to the main body of text. The manuscript is large, with seventeen lines of text per two-hundred and fifteen sheets of paper. Though not all of the Qur'an is illuminated, both the beginning and the end boast elaborate illustration, with blue, gold, and white hues. Ettinghausen describes the subsequent visual effect as "brilliant." The inscriptions feature detailed rosettes, vines, medallions, and arabesques, some exclusively as decoration and others to indicate the end of particular lines of Qur'anic text.

Manuscript production during the Seljuk period was not limited to religious texts. Beyond these religious manuscripts, scientific, literary, and historical pieces were created. One example of a secular manuscript is the Nusrat al-fatrah, a historiographical and literary account of the Seljuk period written in 1200 by Imād al-Dīn (Al-Furqan Islamic Heritage Foundation, London). Meanwhile, the scientific manuscripts produced during the Seljuk period oftentimes pertained to geography, physics, mechanics, mathematics, and astronomy. The former Seljuk city of Isfahan not only boasted twelve libraries that contained a total of twelve thousand volumes, but also had an observatory where scholars could record their astrological findings. Secular manuscripts from the Seljuk empire bear illuminations that often relate to the alignment of planets and the zodiac, a couple examples of common themes.

Whether secular or non-secular, Seljuk illuminated manuscripts had enough influence as to inspire other relevant art forms, such as brass or bronze metal objects. For example, the large Qarmathian Qur'an influenced some of the inscriptions on Seljuk ceramic wares. Even mirrors, candlesticks, coins, and jugs manufactured in Anatolia during the Seljuk period would often bear occult astrological images inspired by manuscripts. Occult knowledge persisted in manuscripts produced after the decline in the Seljuk's political power in the late 12th century, as the Seljuk sultanate's influence on the book arts continued in Anatolia.

Historian Andrew Peacock demonstrates an interest in the Seljuks of Anatolia's focus on occult themes and its manifestation in the book arts. Peacock describes this finding as something that challenges the reigning view that the Seljuks were exclusively the "pious defenders of Islam" when it came to larger systems of belief. Some of the occult sciences that the Seljuks took special interest in included geomancy, astrology, alchemy. A relevant occult manuscript from a period of Seljuk influence is the Dustur al-Munajjimin, otherwise known as the "Rules of Astrologers," while another is the Daqa'iq al-Haqa'iq, or the "Fine Points of Eternal Truths." The latter text captures an interest in magic and spells, with a particular focus on calling upon spiritual beings, such as angels, through ritualistic acts (Bibliothèque nationale de France, Paris, Persan 174). The text was written by a man who wrote under a pen name, "Nasiri." Interestingly, Nasiri's Daqa'iq al-Haqa'iq challenges prevailing Islamic understandings of God while encouraging piety and invoking both Sufi terms and themes. For example, while incorporating a Sufi poem, the occult text speaks of supernatural bodies and disputes what Islam considers to be the accepted number of names for God.

Textiles 
Similar to architecture, Seljuk fabrics depict inscriptions and decorative forms. These fabrics represent what could be called a "Sasanian renaissance" marking a new dominance of Persian culture. Textiles, along with literary works, are evidence of this. Contrast is the main feature of different techniques and fabric qualities. Stories of the period are told through a variety of inscriptions. At the same time, higher contrasts generate a more abstract approach to the ornaments and figures within the fabric patterns. Seljuk fabrics that were excavated in 1931 are distinguished by the representation of nature, by minimal ornamental details, and by the combination of colorful linens giving an interchangeable color effect to the fabric. Many realistic natural elements characterize the composition of the fabrics, such as animals and plants, forming patterns consisting of arabesque elements.

Examples of Seljuk art

See also 

 Anatolian Seljuks family tree
 Danishmend
 Ghaznavid Empire
 History of the Turks
 List of battles involving the Seljuk Empire
 List of Turkic dynasties and countries
 Nizari–Seljuk conflicts
 Rahat al-sudur
 Seljuk architecture
 Seljuk dynasty
 Timeline of the Seljuk Sultanate of Rum
 Timeline of the Turkic peoples (500–1300)
 Turkic migration

Notes

Footnotes

References

Sources

Further reading

External links 

States and territories established in 1037
1194 disestablishments in Asia
Former monarchies of Central Asia
Former sultanates
 
1037 establishments in Asia
Medieval Azerbaijan
11th century in Armenia
12th century in Armenia
Medieval Syria
Medieval Iraq
States in medieval Anatolia
Former empires
Former empires in Asia